Andrea Pasinetti  is an American entrepreneur and software engineer. He is the co-founder and CEO of Kira Learning, an Education Technology company. Pasinetti is also a Co-founder of VIAVIA, a video-first e-commerce platform. Previously he founded and was CEO of Teach For China, one of the most influential nonprofit organizations in China.

Pasinetti attended Trinity School in New York and has an undergraduate degree from Princeton University.  He received an MBA from Stanford University’s Graduate School of Business (GSB), and is enrolled in Stanford’s M.S. in Computer Science program.  In 2008 Pasinetti dropped out of Princeton University to found Teach For China (previously China Education Initiative), but later graduated in 2018.

Awards 
Pasinetti was recognized in 2011 by ChinaNewsweek magazine as the most influential foreigner working in China. He was included in Foreign Policy Magazine’s inaugural Pacific Power Index as one of “50 people sharing the U.S.-China relationship.”  In 2014 Pasinetti was recognized by the World Economic Forum (WEF) as a Young Global Leader (YGL).

Personal
Pasinetti is fluent in Mandarin Chinese, and Italian and has given interviews on Chinese television. He is married to former CNBC news anchor Sixuan Li.  The two live in Los Angeles with their three dogs, Alma, Archie, and Hugo.

References

External links 
Education Initiative, PhoenixTelevision June 23, 2012.

Articles

Interviews
最美丽的未来, YixiTalk October 18, 2012.
志愿者支教系列：缩小城乡教育差距付诸行动, PhoenixTV March 28, 2012.
UpClose 04/06/2013 Andrea Pasinetti, Founder and CEO of Teach For China, CCTV English April 8, 2013.

Year of birth missing (living people)
Living people
Princeton School of Public and International Affairs alumni
American nonprofit chief executives